Elastic instability is a form of instability occurring in elastic systems, such as buckling of beams and plates subject to large compressive loads.

There are a lot of ways to study this kind of instability. One of them is to use the method of incremental deformations based on superposing a small perturbation on an equilibrium solution.

Single degree of freedom-systems

Consider as a simple example a rigid beam of length L, hinged in one end and free in the other, and having an angular spring attached to the hinged end. The beam is loaded in the free end by a force F acting in the compressive axial direction of the beam, see the figure to the right.

Moment equilibrium condition

Assuming a clockwise angular deflection , the clockwise moment exerted by the force becomes . The moment equilibrium equation is given by 

where  is the spring constant of the angular spring (Nm/radian). Assuming  is small enough, implementing the Taylor expansion of the sine function and keeping the two first terms yields 

which has three solutions, the trivial , and 

Energy method
The same result can be obtained by considering energy relations. The energy stored in the angular spring is 

Thus, 

The energy equilibrium condition  now yields  as before (besides from the trivial ).

Stability of the solutions

Any solution  is stable iff a small change in the deformation angle  results in a reaction moment trying to restore the original angle of deformation. The net clockwise moment acting on the beam is 

An infinitesimal clockwise change of the deformation angle  results in a moment 

which can be rewritten as 

since  due to the moment equilibrium condition. Now, a solution  is stable iff a clockwise change  results in a negative change of moment  and vice versa. Thus, the condition for stability becomes

By expanding the cosine term in the equation, the approximate stability condition is obtained:

Hence, these solutions are stable.

Multiple degrees of freedom-systems 

By attaching another rigid beam to the original system by means of an angular spring a two degrees of freedom-system is obtained. Assume for simplicity that the beam lengths and angular springs are equal. The equilibrium conditions become

Linearizing by assuming these angles are small yields

The non-trivial solutions to the system is obtained by finding the roots of the determinant of the system matrix, i.e. for 

Thus, for the two degrees of freedom-system there are two critical values for the applied force F. These correspond to two different modes of deformation which can be computed from the nullspace of the system matrix. Dividing the equations by  yields

For the lower critical force the ratio is positive and the two beams deflect in the same direction while for the higher force they form a "banana" shape. These two states of deformation represent the buckling mode shapes of the system.

See also

 Buckling
 Cavitation (elastomers)
 Drucker stability

Further reading

Theory of elastic stability, S. Timoshenko and J. Gere

Continuum mechanics
Structural analysis
Mechanics